The Roman Catholic Diocese of Rubiataba–Mozarlândia is a diocese located in the cities of Rubiataba and Mozarlândia in the Ecclesiastical province of Goiânia in Brazil.

History
On 11 October 1966, Pope Paul VI established the Diocese of Rubiataba–Mozarlândia as the Territorial Prelature of Rubiataba from the Diocese of Goiás and Diocese of Uruaçu.  Blessed John Paul II renamed the prelature as the Territorial Prelature of Rubiataba–Mozarlândia on 18 April 1979.  On 16 October of the same year the prelature was elevated to a diocese.

Leadership
 Prelates of Rubiataba (Roman Rite)
 Bishop Juvenal Roriz, C.Ss.R. (1966.10.27 – 1978.05.05), appointed Archbishop of Juiz de Fora, Minas Gerais
 Prelates of Rubiataba – Mozarlândia (Roman Rite)
 Bishop José Carlos de Oliveira, C.Ss.R. (1979.09.14 – 1979.10.16)
 Bishops of Rubiataba–Mozarlândia (Roman rite)
 Bishop José Carlos de Oliveira, C.Ss.R. (1979.10.16 – 2008.02.27)
 Bishop Adair José Guimarães (2008.02.27 – 2019.02.27), appointed Bishop of Formosa, Goias

References

Roman Catholic dioceses in Brazil
Christian organizations established in 1966
Rubiataba-Mozarlandia, Roman Catholic Diocese of
Roman Catholic dioceses and prelatures established in the 20th century